The Kumengamatea River is a river of the Northland Region of New Zealand's North Island. It flows southwest into the Awaroa River close to the latter's outflow into the Wairoa River.

See also
List of rivers of New Zealand

References

Rivers of the Northland Region
Rivers of New Zealand
Kaipara Harbour catchment